Javier Gómez Cifuentes (born 29 July 1981 in Albacete, Castile-La Mancha), commonly known as Rubio, is a Spanish footballer who plays for CD Los Yébenes as a midfielder.

External links
 
 Futbolme profile  
 QuesoMecánico biography and stats 
 Villarrobledo official profile 

1981 births
Living people
Sportspeople from Albacete
Spanish footballers
Footballers from Castilla–La Mancha
Association football midfielders
Segunda División players
Segunda División B players
Tercera División players
Atlético Albacete players
Deportivo Fabril players
Albacete Balompié players
Ciudad de Murcia footballers
Zamora CF footballers
Spain youth international footballers